The 2016 Vuelta a España was the 71st edition of the race. It was the last of cycling's three Grand Tours to take place during the 2016 road cycling season. The race started in Ourense on 20 August and finished in Madrid on 11 September.

All 18 UCI World Tour teams were automatically entitled to start the race. In May 2016, four UCI Professional Continental teams were awarded wildcard places in the race by the organisers, Unipublic.

Teams

The 18 UCI WorldTeams were automatically invited to participate in the Vuelta. In addition, the race organisers, Unipublic, invited four wildcard teams. These included , the only Spanish-registered UCI Professional Continental team.

UCI WorldTeams

  (riders)
  (riders)
  (riders)
  (riders)
  (riders)
  (riders)
  (riders)
  (riders)
  (riders)
  (riders)
  (riders)
  (riders)
  (riders)
  (riders)
  (riders)
  (riders)
  (riders)
  (riders)

UCI Professional Continental teams

  (riders)
  (riders)
  (riders)
  (riders)

Cyclists

By starting number

By team

By nationality
The 198 riders that competed in the 2016 Vuelta a España represented 37 countries.

References

External links

2016 Vuelta a España
2016